Bacillus mesentericus is a Gram-positive species of bacteria. Strains of this species may contaminate bread dough, forming a sticky, rope-like texture.

This species has been experimentally explored as a potential probiotic.

References

Further reading 

mesentericus